Billy Sothern (February 15, 1977 – September 30, 2022) was an American lawyer. He specialized in capital defense. He represented Albert Woodfox of the Angola 3 and numerous other high profile defendants.

He was the author of the 2007 book Down in New Orleans: Reflections from a Drowned City.

References

External links
https://www.thenation.com/authors/billy-sothern/
Billy Sothern

1977 births
2022 deaths
American lawyers